Japanese football in 2019.

Promotion and relegation 
Teams relegated from J1 League
 Kashiwa Reysol
 V-Varen Nagasaki

Teams promoted to J1 League
 Matsumoto Yamaga
 Oita Trinita

Teams relegated from J2 League
 Roasso Kumamoto
 Kamatamare Sanuki

Teams promoted to J2 League
 FC Ryukyu
 Kagoshima United FC

Teams relegated from J3 League
 No relegation to the Japan Football League

Teams promoted to J3 League
 Vanraure Hachinohe

Teams relegated from Japan Football League
Cobaltore Onagawa

Teams promoted to Japan Football League
 Matsue City FC
 Suzuka Unlimited FC

J1 League

J2 League

J3 League

Japan Football League

National team (Men)

Results

Players statistics

National team (Women)

Results

Players statistics

References 

 
Seasons in Japanese football